Hua Hin Jazz Festival is a jazz festival in Hua Hin, Thailand. The festival, organized by Hilton since 2001, is usually held in June and features Thailand's best jazz talent.

References

External links
Official site

Jazz festivals in Thailand
Music festivals established in 2001
2001 establishments in Thailand
Music festivals in Thailand